

QG52A Disinfectants

Empty group

QG52B Teat canal devices

Empty group

QG52C Emollients

Empty group

QG52X Various products for teats and udder

Empty group

References

G52